Allan Boyko (born March 2, 1967) is a former Canadian football player who played with the Saskatchewan Roughriders and Winnipeg Blue Bombers as a wide receiver and return specialist. Boyko caught 92 passes for 1,131 yards and 9 receiving touchdowns in his career. He also returned 182 punts for 996 yards and 36 kickoffs for 590 yards.

References 

Living people
1967 births
Sportspeople from Hamilton, Ontario
Players of Canadian football from Ontario
Canadian football wide receivers
Canadian football return specialists
American football wide receivers
Canadian players of American football
Western Michigan Broncos football players
Saskatchewan Roughriders players
Winnipeg Blue Bombers players